The 1911 Washington football team was an American football team that represented the University of Washington during the 1911 college football season. In its fourth season under coach Gil Dobie, the team compiled a 7–0 record, shut out five of seven opponents, and outscored all opponents by a combined total of 227 to 9. William Coyle was the team captain.

Schedule

References

Washington
Washington Huskies football seasons
College football undefeated seasons
Washington football